Paramakudi taluk is a taluk of Ramanathapuram district of the Indian state of Tamil Nadu. See Paramakudi for more information.

Demographics
According to the 2011 census, the taluk of Paramakudi had a population of 265,003 with 134,080  males and 130,923 females. There were 976 women for every 1000 men. The taluk had a literacy rate of 74.06. Child population in the age group below 6 was 11,966 Males and 11,552 Females.

Villages 
 

Kamuthakudi

References 

Taluks of Ramanathapuram district